Tomatokeftedes are fried tomato balls served as an appetizer on the Greek island of Santorini, and generally Cyclades. The dish is made from crushed or pureed tomatoes fried in oil. The batter is tomatoes and flour kneaded into a dough along with spices, parsley, onion, and mint; the dough is then fried in cooking oil and served as an appetizer. Santorini-grown tomatoes are preferred, as the island's rugged terrain and pumice-laced soil makes for more robust fruits.

References 

 

Cyclades
Greek cuisine
Tomato dishes
Vegan cuisine
Deep fried foods